Adresseavisen (commonly known as Adressa) is a regional newspaper published daily, except Sundays, in Trondheim, Norway. The paper has been in circulation since 1767 and is one of the oldest newspapers after Norske Intelligenz-Seddeler which was launched in 1763.

Adresseavisen is owned by Polaris Media, in which Schibsted controls 29% of the shares.

History and profile

The newspaper was first published on 3 July 1767 as Kongelig allene privilegerede Trondheims Adresse-Contoirs Efterretninger, making it the oldest Norwegian newspaper still being published. The paper was founded as a classified advertising publication. The name of the newspaper was changed several times before its present name began to be used in 1927. Locally it is often referred to as Adressa. The newspaper is based in Trondheim and covers the areas of Trøndelag and Nordmøre.

Martinus Lind Nissen (1744–1795) was the founder and first editor of Adresseavisen. At his death, Nissen was succeeded by Mathias Conrad Peterson, a French-oriented revolutionary pioneering radical journalism in Norway. Later editors, however, have been more conservative. In Peterson's age the paper was renamed Trondhjemske Tidender (roughly Trondhjem Times) and began to look more like a modern newspaper. Changing names, owners and profile several times during the 19th century, the paper was named Trondhjems Adresseavis in 1890. Its first press picture was published in 1893. During the 1920s, the paper was nearly bankrupted, but it was saved by the new editor, Harald Houge Torp, who held the position until 1969.

Adresseavisen describes itself as conservative and is part of the Adresseavisen Media Group which owns several smaller local newspapers in the Trøndelag region. It also owns and operates a local radio station, Radio-Adressa, and a local TV station, TV-Adressa (prior to 30 January 2006: TVTrøndelag). In addition, the company owns the local newspapers Fosna-Folket, Hitra-Frøya, Levanger-Avisa, Sør-Trøndelag, Trønderbladet and Verdalingen. As of 2006 Schibsted had a share of the paper (31.7%). Stocks in Adresseavisen are traded on the Oslo Stock Exchange.

Adressavisen became the first Norwegian newspaper to use computer technology in 1967. Its website was launched in 1996. Gunnar Flikke was editor-in-chief from 1989 to 2006. Adresseavisen switched from broadsheet to tabloid format on 16 September 2006.

Circulation
Adresseavisen sold 87,000 copies in 2003, 79,789 in 2007 and 61,086 in 2014.

The online newspaper Adressa.no had an average of 155,000 daily readers in 2015.

See also
List of oldest companies

Notable chief editors

Martinus Nissen (1767–1795)
Matthias Conrad Peterson (1795–1800)
Harald Torp (1927 – 1941, 1945 – 1969)
Jacob Skylstad (1941–1945)
Andreas Norland (1975–1977)
Kjell Einar Amdahl (1977–1996)
Gunnar Flikke (1989–2006)
Arne Blix (2007–2015)
Tor Olav Mørseth (2015–2017)
Kirsti Husby (2017 – incumbent)

References

External links
 Adresseavisens online edition
 Historical issues from 1767 onwards at the National Library of Norway

1767 establishments in Norway
Daily newspapers published in Norway
Mass media in Trondheim
Norwegian-language newspapers
Polaris Media
Publications established in 1767
Self-censorship